Hajji Bekandeh-ye Koshk-e Bijar Rural District is a rural district (dehestan) in Khoshk-e Bijar District, Rasht County, Gilan Province, Iran.

Demographics 
At the 2006 census, its population was 9,973, in 2,928 families. The rural district has 16 villages.

References 

Rural Districts of Gilan Province
Rasht County